King William Training School, also known as the Pamunkey Baptist Association Building and King William Training Academy, is a historic Rosenwald school complex located at King William, King William County, Virginia.  The complex was built in 1922–1923, and consists of the school, a home economics building, a shop building (ruin), and the girls’ privy (ruin).

It was listed on the National Register of Historic Places in 2006.

The King William Academy had its inception through a vision activated by the Reverend Dr. Samuel B. Holmes, a former pastor of the Third Union Baptist Church.  The King William Academy was initially erected on the property of Dr. Holmes and his wife, Martha Bundy Holmes.  Students throughout King William and King & Queen Counties attended the school with some students actually boarding with the Holmes' and other families in close proximity to the Academy.

References

External links

African-American history of Virginia
Defunct schools in Virginia
School buildings on the National Register of Historic Places in Virginia
National Register of Historic Places in King William County, Virginia
School buildings completed in 1923
Schools in King William County, Virginia
1923 establishments in Virginia